Dağ Kəsəmən (also, Dagkesaman) is a village and the most populous municipality, except for the capital Ağstafa, in the Agstafa Rayon of Azerbaijan.  It has a population of 6,866.

References 

Populated places in Aghstafa District